Kaleidoscope Eyes: Music of the Beatles is an album by John Daversa, released on May 6, 2016. It earned Daversa a Grammy Award nomination for Best Large Jazz Ensemble Album.

Track listing
 "Good Day Sunshine" (with Renee Olstead) (Lennon–McCartney) - 5:14	
 "And I Love Her" (Lennon–McCartney) - 4:40	
 "Lucy in the Sky with Diamonds" (Lennon–McCartney) - 7:00	
 "Here Comes the Sun" (George Harrison) - 9:34	
 "Do You Want to Know a Secret" (with Renee Olstead) (Lennon–McCartney) - 4:45	
 "I Saw Her Standing There" (with Katisse) (Lennon–McCartney) - 10:35	
 "Michelle" (Lennon–McCartney) - 9:40	
 "Kaleidoscope Eyes Medley: With a Little Help from My Friends/Ob-La-Di Ob-La-Da/Sgt. Pepper's Lonely Hearts Club Band/I Am the Walrus" (Lennon–McCartney) - 6:46	
 "Good Day Sunshine (Reprise)" - 2:08

Track listing adapted from AllMusic.

References

2016 albums
Covers albums
Jazz albums by American artists